The Dalton Gang is a 1949 American Western film starring Don "Red" Barry and Julie Adams. It was directed by Ford Beebe.

Plot

External links

The Dalton Gang at TCMDB

1949 films
American Western (genre) films
Films directed by Ford Beebe
Dalton Gang
1949 Western (genre) films
Lippert Pictures films
American black-and-white films
1940s English-language films
1940s American films